Ridgefield Christian School (RCS) is a private, non-denominational Christian school in Jonesboro, Arkansas, United States. The school provides Christ-centered education to more than 165 students in prekindergarten through grade 12.

Academics  
Ridgefield Christian School is fully accredited through ANSAA (Arkansas Nonpublic School Accrediting Association). The curriculum follows the guidelines established through the ANSAA, and the Arkansas Department of Education (ADE) Smart Core curriculum.

Extracurricular activities 
The RCS mascot for academic and athletic teams is the Warrior with green and gold serving as the school colors.

Athletics 
For 2012–14, the Warriors at the junior varsity and varsity levels compete in the 1A Region 3 East Conference as administered by the Arkansas Activities Association. The school participates in volleyball, golf (boys/girls), bowling (boys/girls), basketball (boys/girls), baseball, and track and field (boys/girls).

Golf- The RCS Golf team has placed first in district for individual boys, and 6th place in State for Girls.

 Tennis: The boys tennis team won the 2A/1A classification state tennis championship in 2011.
 2016- The girl and boy tennis team won 1A district

References

External links
 

Christian schools in Arkansas
Private high schools in Arkansas
Private middle schools in Arkansas
Private elementary schools in Arkansas
Schools in Craighead County, Arkansas
Buildings and structures in Jonesboro, Arkansas